The Isaac Murphy Award is an American honor presented annually since 1995 by the National Turf Writers Association of the United States to the thoroughbred horse racing jockey with the highest winning percentage who has ridden in a minimum of 500 races during the year. The award is named in honor of Isaac Murphy, a 19th-century African American Hall of Fame jockey.

Since its inception, Hall of Fame jockey Russell Baze has won it every year except for 2004, when he placed second.

Past winners: 
1995 : Russell Baze
1996 : Russell Baze
1997 : Russell Baze
1998 : Russell Baze
1999 : Russell Baze
2000 : Russell Baze
2001 : Russell Baze
2002 : Russell Baze
2003 : Russell Baze
2004 : Ramon Dominguez
2005 : Russell Baze
2006 : Russell Baze
2007 : Russell Baze
2008 : Russell Baze

See also

Isaac Murphy
Russell Baze
National Turf Writers Association

References

External links
 Turfwriters.org news

Horse racing awards
American horse racing awards